Aspergillus jensenii is a species of fungus in the genus Aspergillus. It is from the Versicolores section. The species was first described in 2012.

Growth and morphology

A. jensenii has been cultivated on both Czapek yeast extract agar (CYA) plates and Malt Extract Agar Oxoid® (MEAOX) plates. The growth morphology of the colonies can be seen in the pictures below.

References

Further reading

Fungi described in 2012
jensenii